Joseph Peter Tomczyk (May 19, 1935 – October 4, 1995) was born in Wilkes-Barre, Pennsylvania. He was ordained to the priesthood on April 19, 1954, and consecrated bishop in Scranton, Pennsylvania on October 18, 1993. He served as the second diocesan Bishop of the Canadian Diocese of the Polish National Catholic Church until his death.

References

American bishops
Bishops of the Polish National Catholic Church
1935 births
1995 deaths
People from Wilkes-Barre, Pennsylvania
American people of Polish descent
20th-century American clergy